is a Japanese footballer who plays as a defender for Verspah Oita on loan from Tokushima Vortis.

Club career
Kume made his professional debut for Tokushima Vortis in an Emperor's Cup win against Ehime FC.

Career statistics

Club

References

2000 births
Living people
Association football people from Tokushima Prefecture
Japanese footballers
Japan youth international footballers
Association football defenders
Tokushima Vortis players
Veertien Mie players
Verspah Oita players